KTQX (90.1 FM) is a radio station broadcasting a World Ethnic format. Licensed to Bakersfield, California, United States, the station is currently owned by Radio Bilingue, Inc.

See also
List of community radio stations in the United States

References

External links

 
 
 
 
 
 

TQX
Radio stations established in 1993
TQX
1993 establishments in California
Community radio stations in the United States